Manfred Bender (born 24 May 1966) is a German football manager and  former player. He last managed Austria Klagenfurt. Between 1989 and 1999 he played for FC Bayern Munich, Karlsruher SC and 1860 Munich. In total Bender played 229 games in the Bundesliga, scoring 42 goals. Bender is most fondly remembered for a goal scored against Oliver Kahn and Bayern Munich in the Bundesliga.

Career
In summer 1989, Bender was playing in the second level of the Bundesliga, for SpVgg Unterhaching, then FC Bayern Munich. He was an emerging talent of the same style as Jürgen Kohler, Alan McInally and Radmilo Mihajlovic. In spite of this competition he made 20 appearances in the season and scored two goals. He also played and scored as they won the 1990 DFB-Supercup.

Next season, Bender played 33 games, and scored five goals, as he was now a fully-fledged member of the squad. Season 1991–92 went badly for Bayern, as they went through three coaches (Jupp Heynckes, Søren Lerby and Erich Ribbeck). Bender moved to Karlsruhe in 1992 after a bad end-of-season result, in a direct swap with Mehmet Scholl.

Bender moved to Karlsruhe in what became a very attack-minded team which immediately reached the UEFA Cup. In his strongest season to date, including a 7–0 victory over Valencia CF, Bender contributed significantly, helping them to reach the 1996 German Cup final.

1996 saw Bender transfer to TSV 1860 Munich. He played there for three seasons, but in his last, only saw six full matches. For one season he moved back to Karlsruhe, and then two more (2000–02) were spent playing for 1. FC Saarbrücken, a second-league team. Then he played some years in the lower leagues, and has, since 2006, embraced a new career, coaching in Austria.

In February 2011, Bender was appointed fitness trainer for the Nigerian national team.

References

External links
 
 

1966 births
Living people
German footballers
Footballers from Munich
Association football midfielders
Bundesliga players
2. Bundesliga players
SpVgg Unterhaching players
FC Bayern Munich footballers
Karlsruher SC players
TSV 1860 Munich players
1. FC Saarbrücken players
SV Wilhelmshaven players
German football managers
SK Austria Klagenfurt managers
West German footballers